Bardehsur may refer to:
 Bardehsur, Sardasht
 Bardehsur, Urmia